Manning is a city in and the county seat of Clarendon County, South Carolina, United States. The population was 4,108 as of the 2010 census, with an estimated population in 2018 of 3,941. It was named after former South Carolina governor John Laurence Manning.

History
In 1855, the South Carolina Legislature appointed a group of commissioners to select and purchase a tract of land for "the Village of Manning" in the newly formed Clarendon County. According to the Watchmen, a local newspaper of the time, "the Legislature (had) granted a bill of divorce between Clarendon and Claremont (Sumter)."

Five other commissioners, R. I. Manning, L. F. Rhame, J. B. Brogdon, J. J. Conyers, and William A. Burgess, were later named when it came time to erect the courthouse and jail from a state appropriation of $18,000, plus whatever funds might be realized from the sale of lots. The site for the village was presented to the state by Captain Joseph Copley Burgess, and the Plat of Manning was prepared and filed in Sumter County Courthouse. (Captain Burgess had also donated land for the courthouse and jail in Manning.) On the second Monday of the following October, the new district officers were elected, and Clarendon began to operate independently from Sumter District with Manning as its county seat.

The city was named for John Lawrence Manning, who was elected to both chambers in the General Assembly. He was later chosen by the Assembly to serve as Governor of South Carolina from 1852 to 1854. George Allen Huggins was the first intendant (mayor) of Manning.

Manning's Post Office was established in 1856, and Thomas S. Coogler was appointed as the first Postmaster. Manning's first library, the Hannah Levi Memorial Library, was completed in 1910. It was funded by the children of Moses and Hannah Levi, and by the sale of the Moses Levi Institute. They named it in honor of their mother. It eventually became known as the Manning Library and was the only public library in the county. It became a county library in 1976 and continued to operate until the opening of the Harvin Clarendon County Library in 1984. The building now houses the Clarendon County Archives and History Center.

Manning was severely damaged several times over its history. A large portion of the original town, including the courthouse, was destroyed in the Civil War in 1865 during what is known as "Potter's Raid". This raid by Union troops took place only a few days before Gen. Robert E. Lee's surrender at Appomattox. Manning was later struck by a downtown fire in 1895 and damaged by a tornado in 1915.

Railroads, abundant timber and diverse agriculture allowed Manning to flourish during the late 19th century and into the 20th century. In 1933, Highway 4 was changed to U.S. Route 301 and thanks in part to the efforts of Manning resident W. P. Legg, Manning and Clarendon County became a preferred route of the Washington to Florida motorist. Manning is along the I-95 corridor and attracts retirees looking for various recreational activities and mild climates.

As early as 1960 Manning was one of many towns across the South for the staging of peaceful Civil Rights demonstrations and sit-ins. Unlike in some other areas, the demonstrations in Manning occurred without significant incident, but helped belie the local media's message that black Carolinians accepted the status quo. Manning and the surrounding region was still adjusting to the decisions handed down in the Briggs v. Elliott and Brown v. Board of Education rulings against racial segregation in schools.

In 1969 Pansy Ridgeway became the first woman to be elected mayor of Manning. She served as mayor of Manning from 1970–96 and was the third woman elected mayor in South Carolina and the first woman elected president of the South Carolina Municipal Association.

On April 5, 2022, an EF2 tornado caused considerable damage on the western and northwestern sides of towns. Many homes, businesses, garages, trees, power poles and lines, and vehicles were damaged, some heavily.

Government
The city government consists of a mayor and a city council. The mayor is elected at-large, and the council consists of six members who are elected from each of six districts.

Manning is represented in the South Carolina Senate by Kevin L. Johnson.  It is part of South Carolina's 6th congressional district which since January 1993 has been represented by Jim Clyburn.

Media
Manning is home to The Manning Times newspaper. It is published weekly and is updated online daily.

Education
Manning maintained school systems, one for black students and one for whites until court-ordered integration caused Manning Training School (for blacks) to merge with all white Manning High School in 1970. At that time, Manning Training School became Manning Middle School, then later Manning Elementary. In response, a private school, Laurence Manning Academy was created. Manning is also the location of the F.E. DuBose Campus of Central Carolina Technical College.

Manning  has a lending library, the Clarendon County Public Library.

Geography
Manning is located near the center of Clarendon County at  (33.693998, -80.215408). It is just to the east of Interstate 95 and at the intersection of U.S. 301 and U.S. 521. US 301 leads northeast  to Turbeville and southwest  to Summerton, while US 521 leads northwest  to Sumter and southeast  to Greeleyville.

It is just south of the Pocotaligo River, a tributary of the Black River.

Adjacent counties

Demographics

2020 census

As of the 2020 United States Census, there were 3,878 people, 1,485 households, and 1,036 families residing in the city.

2000 census
As of the census of 2000, there were 4,025 people, 1,550 households, and 1,063 families residing in the city. The population density was 1,671.1 people per square mile (644.8/km2). There were 1,727 housing units at an average density of 717.0 per square mile (276.7/km2). The racial makeup of the city was 62.36% African American, 35.80% White,  0.62% Asian, 0.25% Native American, 0.07% Pacific Islander, 0.40% from other races, and 0.50% from two or more races. Hispanic or Latino of any race were 1.04% of the population.

There were 1,550 households, out of which 31.9% had children under the age of 18 living with them, 35.3% were married couples living together, 29.2% had a female householder with no husband present, and 31.4% were non-families. 29.4% of all households were made up of individuals, and 14.5% had someone living alone who was 65 years of age or older. The average household size was 2.52 and the average family size was 3.10.

In the city, the population was spread out, with 27.8% under the age of 18, 9.2% from 18 to 24, 24.7% from 25 to 44, 21.8% from 45 to 64, and 16.4% who were 65 years of age or older. The median age was 36 years. For every 100 females, there were 80.4 males. For every 100 females age 18 and over, there were 72.4 males.

The median income for a household in the city was $22,483, and the median income for a family was $26,269. Males had a median income of $26,135 versus $19,086 for females. The per capita income for the city was $11,502. About 23.8% of families and 30.1% of the population were below the poverty line, including 38.5% of those under age 18 and 20.3% of those age 65 or over.

Notable people

Fred Bennett, defensive back for the Cincinnati Bengals
David du Bose Gaillard, engineer of the central portion of the Panama Canal, after whom the Gaillard Cut is named. He died before the work was finished.
Marian McKnight, Miss America 1957
Glenn Murray, who played pro baseball as outfielder with the Philadelphia Phillies, starting 1996
Peggy Parish, originating author of the Amelia Bedelia series of children's books. 
Darren Robinson (rapper), member of The Fat Boys
Joseph O. Rogers, Jr., Democratic member of the South Carolina House of Representatives, 1955-1966; the 1966 Republican nominee for governor of South Carolina, an attorney in Manning
Luther Vandross, American soul singer, lived part of his childhood in Manning

References

External links
City of Manning official website
Clarendon County Archives and History Center

Cities in South Carolina
Cities in Clarendon County, South Carolina
County seats in South Carolina